Charles Dillon, 10th Viscount Dillon (1701–1741) fought in the War of the Polish Succession for France under Berwick as colonel-proprietor of Dillon's Regiment at the Siege of Kehl in 1733 and the Siege of Philippsburg in 1734. After the armistice, he married, moved to Ireland, and succeeded his cousin Richard as the 10th Viscount Dillon.

Birth and origins 
Charles was born in 1701, most likely at the Jacobite court at the Château de Saint-Germain-en-Laye, in France. He was the eldest of the five sons of Arthur Dillon and his wife Christina Sheldon. His father was born in 1670 in Ireland, fought for the Jacobites in the Williamite War and had gone to France as the colonel of Dillon's Regiment with the Irish Brigade in April 1690 when Irish troops were sent to France in exchange for French troops sent to Ireland with Lauzun. His father was a younger son of the 7th Viscount Dillon. His father's family was Old English Irish and descended from Sir Henry Dillon who came to Ireland with Prince John in 1185. 

Charles's mother's first name is given as Christina or as Christiana. She was a daughter of Ralph Sheldon. Dominic Sheldon, the English Catholic Jacobite, was her uncle. She was a maid of honour to Queen Mary of Modena, wife of James II. Both parents were thus Jacobites and Catholics. Charles had four brothers and three sisters, who are listed in his father's article.

Early life and career 
While Charles was a child, he lived with his mother at the Jacobite court at the Château de Saint-Germain-en-Laye where James II of England died on 16 September 1701 N.S.,
 the year of Charles's birth. James II was succeeded by James Francis Edward, whom Louis XIV immediately recognised as the rightful heir to the thrones of England, Scotland and Ireland. Dillon's Regiment, led by Charles's father, fought for France in the War of the Spanish Succession (1701–1714). Louis XIV made Charles's father lieutenant-general in 1706 and comte de Dillon in 1711. However, in 1713 France signed the Peace of Utrecht, recognising the Hanoverian succession and ending its support for the Jacobites. James Francis Edward had to leave France and went to the Duchy of Lorraine, then to Avignon, and finally to Italy. His mother, the dowager queen Mary of Modena, however, stayed behind at Saint-Germain-en-Laye where she died in 1718.

On 13 January 1714 Charles's uncle Henry, the 8th Viscount Dillon, died in Ireland.
 This uncle had been attainted as Jacobite in 1690 but had been pardoned and had obtained the reversal of the attainder in 1693. He was succeeded by his son Richard as the 9th Viscount Dillon, to whom Charles would succeed later as the 10th Viscount.

On 10 November 1718, Charles was made a captain in the regiment. In 1722 James Francis Edward Stuart (the old pretender), who now resided in Rome, created his father Earl of Dillon.

In 1730 his father retired from active service and on 1 May 1730 Charles became colonel of Dillon's Regiment. On 5 February 1733 N.S., Charles's father died at the Château de Saint-Germain-en-Laye. Charles, already colonel, now also succeeded in his father's titles: 2nd Earl of Dillon in the Jacobite peerage and comte de Dillon in France.

During the War of the Polish Succession (1733–1735), the comte de Dillon, as he now was, and his younger brother Henry fought under Marshal Berwick, the commander of Louis XV's Rhine army. They fought at the Siege of Kehl, which fell on 28 October 1733. In the campaign of 1734 they undertook the Siege of Philippsburg. On 12 June 1734 Berwick was beheaded by a chance cannonball before Philippsburg and was replaced by Asfeld and Noailles, who shared the command of the army before Philippsburg. The fortress surrendered on 18 July 1734.

Later life: marriage and viscountcy 
On 16 January 1735 Charles, comte de Dillon, married Frances Dillon, daughter of his first cousin Richard Dillon, the 9th Viscount. In 1736 he went to Ireland to take possession of some land that was part of her dowry. His wife must have come with him or joined him later. They never returned to France. His absence from the regiment did not pose a problem at that time as the War of the Polish Succession had ended in 1735 with an armistice and France was to enjoy peace until it became seriously involved in the War of the Austrian Succession with
Maurice de Saxe's raid on Prague in 1741.

In 1737 Richard, the 9th Viscount, his father-in-law, died and Charles, already comte and earl, succeeded as the 10th Viscount Dillon in the Irish peerage. As his wife was Richard's only heiress, Charles, Viscount Dillon, as he now was, also inherited the land.

Charles and Frances had an only son:
Charles Dillon (1738–1739), died young

His wife died on 17 January 1739 in London.

Death, succession, and timeline 
He died on 24 October 1741, aged 40, also in London and was buried in St Pancras cemetery where Catholics were usually buried in London. As his only son had predeceased him, he was succeeded by his younger brother Henry as the 11th Viscount, and also as colonel-proprietor of Dillon's Regiment.

Notes and references

Notes

Citations

Sources 

 
  – Dacre to Dysart (for Dillon)
  – 1700 to 1739 (for Philippsburg)
  – England (for the dowager queen)
  – Scotland and Ireland (for Dillon)
  – A to J
  – 1714 to 1796 (for the sieges of Kehl and Philippsburg)
  – (for timeline)
  – 1733 & 1734
 
 
  – COE to DOU (for Dillon)

 – Viscounts (for Dillon)
 
 
 
 

 

1701 births
1741 deaths
Dillon, Charles Dillon, 10th Viscount